

The Westland Woodpigeon was a British two-seat light biplane designed to compete in the 1924 Lympne light aircraft trials.

Design and development
The Woodpigeon was a conventional wooden biplane powered by a  Bristol Cherub III engine. Two aircraft were built. The first made its first flight on 14 September 1924; the second aircraft, registered G-EBJV, flew in trials but was not successful. The second aircraft was re-engined with a  ABC Scorpion and increased wingspan in 1926 for the 1926 Lympne trials but again was not successful. In 1927 the two aircraft were re-engined with  Anzani 6 radials and redesignated  Woodpigeon IIs

Variants
Woodpigeon I
Bristol Cherub III-powered variant, two built.
Woodpigeon II
Two Woodpigeon Is re-engined with Anzani engines.

Specifications (Woodpigeon I)

Notes

References

1920s British civil utility aircraft
Woodpigeon
Biplanes
Aircraft first flown in 1924